"Dive Bar" is a song recorded by American country music singers Garth Brooks and Blake Shelton. It was released to country radio on June 18, 2019 as the third single on Brooks' fourteenth studio album  Fun. The song was written by Brooks, Bryan Kennedy and Mitch Rossell.

Release and promotion

On June 18, 2019, "Dive Bar" was released only to country radio stations. The digital single was made available for streaming only on July 15, 2019, exclusively through Amazon Music. On July 7, Brooks announced a promotional concert tour in support of the single. The Dive Bar Tour features Brooks visiting seven dive bars throughout the United States.

On July 15, 2019, Brooks performance of the song during the Dive Bar Tour aired on Jimmy Kimmel Live!.

Charts

Weekly charts

Year-end charts

References

2019 singles
Garth Brooks songs
Blake Shelton songs
Male vocal duets
Songs written by Garth Brooks